The Rice–Ramsperger–Kassel–Marcus (RRKM) theory is a theory of chemical reactivity.  It was developed by Rice and Ramsperger in 1927  and Kassel in 1928 (RRK theory) and generalized (into the RRKM theory) in 1952 by Marcus who took the transition state theory developed by Eyring in 1935 into account.  These methods enable the computation of simple estimates of the unimolecular reaction rates from a few characteristics of the potential energy surface.

Assumption 
Assume that the molecule consists of harmonic oscillators, which are connected and can exchange energy with each other.
 Assume the possible excitation energy of the molecule to be , which enables  the reaction to occur.
 The rate of intra-molecular energy distribution is much faster than that of reaction itself.
 As a corollary to the above, the potential energy surface does not have any "bottlenecks" for which certain vibrational modes may be trapped for longer than the average time of the reaction

Derivation 
Assume that  is an excited molecule:

 

The unimolecular rate constant  is obtained as follows:

See also
Transition state theory

References

External links
 An RRKM online calculator

Chemical physics
Quantum chemistry
Molecular physics
Chemical kinetics